Luise Faurschou is a Copenhagen-based Danish curator, art advisor, cultural entrepreneur, thought leader and former art gallerist.

She is the Founding Director of ART 2030 (founded in 2016), a non-profit organization uniting art with the United Nations 2030 Agenda for Sustainable Development Goals. ART 2030 facilitates art projects connected to the UN Global Goals - including critically acclaimed public events, art experiences, and educational activities. In 2021 ART 2030 worked with Superflex on the project 'Interspecies Assembly', debuting in New York at the 76th UN General Assembly. In 2019 ART 2030 worked with artist Jeppe Hein on the project 'Breathe With Me', a public art action on display at UN Headquarters from 21 to 24 September, and in Central Park from 25 to 27 September, 2019. In 2017, ART 2030 curated Ai Weiwei's installation Soleil Levant on the façade of the art institution Kunsthal Charlottenborg, in Copenhagen, Denmark. With over 3,500 lifejackets collected from the shores of the Greek island of Lesbos barricading the outer wall of the exhibition gallery, the work renewed focus to the ongoing European migrant crisis, as well as issues surrounding the topics of equality and justice in mainstream and public discourse.  

Luise Faurschou is frequently interviewed on sustainable behaviour in the art world  and in 2022 she was invited to speak on the role of art at the High-level Thematic Debate: Moment for Nature by the President of the United Nations General Assembly.

Luise Faurschou also manages the art advisory agency Faurschou Art Resources (founded in 2015). As an independent art dealer and curator, Luise Faurschou has traveled worldwide to advise and develop projects for public and private museums and art collections. In 2017, she curated the exhibition 'Human Nature - Doing, Undoing, and Redoing' with works by Louise Bourgeois for Kistefos Museum and Sculpture Park in Norway. In 2019, she curated the exhibition ''Tomorrow is the Question' with works by Alfredo Jaar, Allora & Calzadilla, Cao Fei, Doug Aitken, Hito Steyerl, Olafur Eliasson, Simon Denny and Tómas Saraceno among others for ARoS. Among other notable exhibitions and permanent installations are Jeppe Hein, Yoko Ono and Ai Weiwei at Chateau La Coste. 

In 1986, together with her former partner, Jens Faurschou, she opened Galleri Faurschou in Copenhagen, Denmark. A second gallery in Beijing, China, followed in 2007. Over the years, Galleri Faurschou became a prominent dealer of the works of Edvard Munch and published in collaboration with the Munch Museum The Edvard Munch Catalogue Raisonné through Cappelen Damm and Thames and Hudson. The two galleries mounted a number of exhibitions, showing works by art history icons such as Pablo Picasso, Robert Rauschenberg, Louise Bourgeois, Andy Warhol, Ai Weiwei, Yoko Ono, Shirin Neshat, Gerhard Richter, Danh Vo, Bill Viola, Michael Kvium, Asger Jorn and Christian Lemmerz. After more than twenty years as gallery owners, Luise and Jens Faurschou decided to proceed as a Foundation in 2011. The Copenhagen and Beijing-based Faurschou Foundation is still running, but in 2015 Luise Faurschou stepped out and went independent.

References 

Businesspeople from Copenhagen
Art curators
Danish women curators
Danish women company founders
Women art dealers
Women nonprofit executives
Year of birth missing (living people)
Living people